Mulbarton Wanderers Football Club is a football club based in Mulbarton, Norfolk.

History
The football club was established in 1993 when the youth team of Mulbarton United, a now-defunct Anglian Combination side, broke away to form their own youth team. They merged with the Harford Belles girls team in 2001 and establish in the Central and South Norfolk League, a men's senior team, in Division Four. The club won promotion in their first season, continued to rise through the league, and beginning in 2007–08 season reached Division One. They were promoted to the Anglian Combination Division Six in 2009, and achieved six successive promotions, reaching the Premier Division in 2015. After finishing second in 2018, the club successfully applied to join the Eastern Counties Football League, entering in Division One North for 2018–19.

Their debut season in the Eastern Counties League saw the club compete in the FA Vase for the first time, and in the following season saw the club enter the FA Cup for the first time, losing to Boston Town in the extra preliminary round. In 2021 the club were promoted to the Premier Division based on their results in the abandoned 2019–20 and 2020–21 seasons.

Ground
The club play at Mulberry Park. The ground has one stand, the Ken Lewis Stand, which has sixty seats.

Honours
Anglian Combination 
Division One champions 2014–15
Division Four champions 2011–12
Division Five champions 2010–11
Mummery Cup
Winners 2016–17
Cyril Ballyn Cup
 Winners 2012–13
Norfolk Senior Cup
 Winners 2021–22

Records
Highest league position: 4th in Eastern Counties League Premier Division, 2021–22 
Best FA Cup performance: First Qualifying Round, 2021–22
Best FA Vase performance: Fifth round, 2020–21
Best Norfolk Senior Cup performance: Winners, 2021–22

References

External links
Official website

1993 establishments in England
Football clubs in England
Football clubs in Norfolk
Anglian Combination
Eastern Counties Football League
Association football clubs established in 1993
Mulbarton, Norfolk